Afroeurydemus is a genus of leaf beetles in the subfamily Eumolpinae, found in Africa. The genus was separated from Eurydemus in 1965 by Brian J. Selman, who moved all African species of Eurydemus he had seen to this genus or related African genera and considered it likely that Eurydemus was restricted to Fiji. Many species were also originally placed in Syagrus.

Species

Synonyms:
Afroeurydemus jansoni (Baly, 1878): synonym of Afroeurydemus carinatus (Bryant, 1954) (priority?)
 Afroeurydemus signatus Selman, 1972: renamed to Afroeurydemus selmani Zoia, 2019
 Angoleumolpus grandis Pic, 1953: synonym of Afroeurydemus bipunctatus (Weise, 1883)
 Eurydemus geniculatus Jacoby, 1904: synonym of Afroeurydemus nubiensis (Harold, 1877)
 Microsyagrus cribricollis Pic, 1952: renamed to Afroeurydemus fortesculptus Zoia, 2019
 Syagrus quadrimaculatus Pic, 1940: renamed to Afroeurydemus parvomaculatus Zoia, 2019

References

Eumolpinae
Chrysomelidae genera
Beetles of Africa